Arash Borhani (born 14 September 1983 in Kerman, Iran) is a retired Iranian football player and coach. He is the all-time top goal scorer of Esteghlal and also the second all-time top goal scorer in Iran's Premier Football League. He was the top goal scorer of 2008–09 Iran's Premier Football League. He was also a member of the Iran national football team. Borhani won a bronze medal in 2006 Asian Games with Iran national under-23 football team.

Club career

Pas
Having just moved to Pas in the Iran's Premier Football league, he helped the club to finish second in the 2002–03 season. He scored four goals in the season, which three of them was on a hat-trick in the last match of the season. He continued with Pas for the next seasons and became a fixed starter. He was one of club's main players in 2005 AFC Champions League season.

Al-Nasr
Shortly before the 2006 FIFA World Cup, Borhani signed for the UAE Pro League, Al Nasr. On 21 January 2007 Borhani signed back with his former team Pas after being released by Al Nasr due to unforeseen circumstances. Since signing back with Pas, within a period of five months, he has scored only twice, which has put him through the most difficult time in his career.

Esteghlal
Borhani had offers from Al-Ain of the UAE, Mouscron of the Belgian League, Vitória Setúbal of the Portuguese Liga, Denizlispor of the Süper Lig and Mes Kerman and Esteghlal of Iran's Premier Football League, though it was not known which offer Borhani was likely to accept. However, on 17 July 2007 Borhani signed a contract with the IPL giants Esteghlal. On 27 October Borhani scored his first hat-trick for Esteghlal in a 3–2 win over Paykan. Borhani again scored a hat-trick plus two against Pegah Gilan in the Hazfi Cup ending up with five goals, the game's final score being 8–1 in favor of Esteghlal. He became the top scorer in 2008–09 season with 21 goals. The next season, he scored 11 goals but missed so many chances during the final matches of the season. On 14 January 2013, he became Esteghlal's all-time top goal scorers after scoring against Mes Kerman, surprising Ali Jabbari. He was his team's top scorer at the 2012–13 season, which they won the Iran Pro League title. He extended his contract with the club for next two seasons on 1 July 2013. On 9 February 2014, Borhani scored his 100th goal for Esteghlal in a 2–0 win over Saipa. On 14 June 2014, Borhani signed a new contract with Esteghlal, keeping him until 2016.

Club career statistics
Last update: July 17, 2018

1 Statistics Incomplete.

Assist Goals

International career
While playing for Pas Tehran, he was called to the Iran U-23 team for the 2004 Athens Olympics qualifications, where he had some good performances, including scoring four goals in two games versus Uzbekistan. Despite the talent on the team, the Iran U-23 team did not qualify for the 2004 Summer Olympics.

Around the same time he was called up to the Team Melli, where he scored some crucial goals, such as the tying goal versus Qatar in a 2006 FIFA World Cup qualification match. He was not a regular starter for the team, but he was among Iran's final squad for 2006 FIFA World Cup.

In November 2006, he once again joined Iran U-23 team to participate at the 2006 Asian Games. In the quarter-final match against China, Borhani held the ball short of the goal line and invited his teammates to approach after masterfully dribbling around the Chinese goalkeeper. He held that position for a few seconds before moving the ball over the line and then started running with joy towards the bench and celebrating with others. Later on he apologized for dishonoring the China U-23 team.

He was called up to the national squad by Iranian coach Ali Daei to play in 2010 FIFA World Cup qualification – AFC Third Round. He also played in 2011 AFC Asian Cup qualification for Team Melli.

International goals
Scores and results list Iran's goal tally first.

Honours

Club
Pas Tehran
Iran Pro League (1): 2003–04

Esteghlal
Iran Pro League (2): 2008–09, 2012–13 
Hazfi Cup (2): 2007–08, 2011–12

Country
WAFF Championship (1): 2004

Individual
Iran Pro League top goalscorer (1): 2008–09

References

External links

Arash Borhani at PersianLeague.com
Arash Borhani at TeamMelli.com

Borhani's goal in the 2006 Asian Games quarterfinals – from YouTube

Iranian footballers
Association football forwards
Pas players
2004 AFC Asian Cup players
2006 FIFA World Cup players
Esteghlal F.C. players
Iranian expatriate footballers
People from Kerman
1983 births
Living people
Iran international footballers
Al-Nasr SC (Dubai) players
Asian Games bronze medalists for Iran
Asian Games medalists in football
Footballers at the 2006 Asian Games
Medalists at the 2006 Asian Games
UAE Pro League players
Persian Gulf Pro League players
People from Kerman Province